An ear piercing instrument (commonly referred to as a piercing gun or an ear piercing gun) is a device designed to pierce earlobes by driving a pointed starter earring through the lobe.  Piercing guns may be reusable or disposable.  Piercing guns are typically used in mall jewelry shops.

Piercing guns have been widely criticized as dangerous among professional body piercers.  The use of older designs of piercing gun can possibly carry an increased risk of disease transmission, as compared to methods used by professional piercers. However, more modern designs of reusable piercing gun have addressed this problem by the use of self-contained disposable cartridges. With these new designs, all parts of the gun that could come into contact with the customer's body are made of medical-grade plastic, which is sterilised at the time of manufacture and stored in sealed packaging that is only opened immediately before use in exactly the same way as the needles used by body piercing establishments. This automatically removes the problem of possible disease transmission found in the earlier types of device. There are still the issues of blunt force trauma to the skin and underlying tissue. Standard ear piercing studs are too short for some earlobes and most cartilage.  Diminished air and blood circulation in tissue compressed by a piercing gun can lead to prolonged healing, minor complications and scarring. However, this problem has also been addressed in more recent gun-based systems, which use longer and thinner posts on the earrings, which also have much sharper points. These newer designs reduce the trauma to the skin and tissue, but cannot compare to hollow needles used professionally. Also, while most older ear piercing studs were not made of materials certified by the FDA, ISO, or ASTM as safe for long term implant in the human body, which could lead to materials from underlying alloys leaching into human tissue through corrosion, scratches and surface defects, causing cytotoxicity and allergic reaction, more recent designs offer much safer options such as titanium.

Design and use

Traditional model
The most common design uses a spring that stores potential energy when part of the ear piercing instrument is pulled back. Pre-sterilized starter studs and matching friction backs are typically provided in pairs by the piercing gun manufacturer in sealed containers. A starter stud has a point that is designed to penetrate the earlobe when the mechanism is released. Ear piercing instruments are designed to pierce using 20- or 18-gauge earrings, normally made out of surgical steel, 24 kt. gold plated steel, 14 kt. gold, or titanium.

On the oldest types of piercing gun, one starter stud is manually loaded into a receiving tube, and its matching friction back is loaded into a holder closer to the main part of the instrument. The earlobe is inserted between these two parts of the instrument.  When the trigger is squeezed, the spring is released, causing the instrument to close with considerable pressure.  The stud is forced through the earlobe, engaging it into the friction back. This model cannot be sterilized.

Disposable cartridge model
Some newer models of piercing guns use a disposable cartridge, sometimes called a cassette.  With these models, the stud holder and clasp holder are entirely disposable. In some parts of the world, e.g. most of Europe and Australia, this modification is either specifically required (e.g. in Scotland) or implied by Health And Safety legislation. The image shows a White Disposable Cartridge System, loaded with a blue cartridge and a gold stud.

Hand clasp model
A newer design does not use a spring to force the starter earring through the earlobe; instead, the operator must manually squeeze a hand grip in order to force the stud through the ear.  Some of these models work with earrings in capsules, which are loaded into the instrument without the operator touching them.  A wider variety of jewelry shapes and designs are available for newer piercing instruments.

Criticism
Piercing guns are widely criticized in the body piercing community.  Shannon Larratt, editor and publisher of BME and a vocal critic of the piercing gun, penned an essay titled Piercing guns are blasphemy!, where he described the piercing gun as an inherently flawed, dangerous instrument that should never be used.  Larratt also printed T-shirts which featured an image of a piercing gun with a red circle and line through it, to mean No Piercing Guns.  BME also published an article titled Do Piercing Guns Suck?.

Use on areas other than the ear lobe
These guns are not designed to pierce through the cartilage of the upper ear, or to pierce any part of the body other than the ear lobe. Some U.S. states and some countries in Europe have already banned piercing guns for use on cartilage, including ear cartilage and nostrils.  Improper usage of piercing instruments upon areas of the body not intended for their use can lead to additional problems.  Jewelry that is too short for the tissue, or inappropriately shaped, especially jewelry used in the mouth, can embed itself into the body, with the wound effectively healing over it. This can require the surgical removal of the jewelry in some cases and can lead to abscesses, infection and severe scarring. In many piercings, the narrow gauge of the jewelry used by piercing guns can lead to tearing and other ongoing trauma that expose the body to infection and cause permanent scarring.  A post to BMEzine titled Gun Piercing shows graphic photos of a severe infection of the ear cartilage after piercing it with a piercing gun, which later required reconstructive surgery.

This is one area where both the body piercing community and supporters of piercing guns do agree, and most responsible manufacturers of piercing guns strongly advise against such use. However, some less reputable users of piercing guns still continue to offer such piercings.

Images

See also
 Earring
 Body piercing
 Body modification

References

Ear piercing